"It's a Miracle" is the fifth and final single from new wave band Culture Club's 1983 Colour by Numbers album. The song became the group's sixth hit on the UK Singles Chart, peaking at number 4. It reached number 13 on the US Billboard Hot 100, and number 5 in Canada.

The B-side of the 7-inch single is a live rendition of "Love Twist", a song from the group's first album. It was recorded in December 1983. An additional live track, "Melting Pot" (a cover of the song by the group Blue Mink), from the same show was available on the 12-inch single.

Reception
Cash Box called the song "a perfect example of British adopted American R&B."

Music video
The music video features the band playing around on a circular board with various Monopoly spaces placed around the edges. Interspersed with these are clips from previous Culture Club music videos.

Track listing
Released at least in UK, Canada, USA, Australia, France, Germany, Spain
A. "It's a Miracle"
B. "Love Twist (Live)"

Released in Peru and Ecuador
A. "It's a Miracle"
B. "Miss Me Blind"

12-inch
Released at least in UK, Australia, Japan, Germany, Portugal, Spain, El Salvador
A1. "It's a Miracle/Miss Me Blind (Multimix)"
B1. "Love Twist (Live)"
B2. "Melting Pot (Live)"

Chart performance
The song became the group's sixth top-five hit on the UK Singles Chart, peaking at number four. It reached number thirteen on the US Billboard Hot 100. and number 16 on the Canadian RPM chart. It also reached number eight on the U.S. Adult Contemporary chart and number two on the Canadian Adult Contemporary chart.

Weekly charts

Year-end charts

Appearances
The song was first called "It's America", relating to Culture Club's first trip to the United States. It was later changed.

The song appears as a cover in Dance Dance Revolution Extreme as "Miracle."

References

1983 songs
1984 singles
Culture Club songs
Music videos directed by Steve Barron
Song recordings produced by Steve Levine
Virgin Records singles
Epic Records singles
Songs written by Phil Pickett
Songs written by Boy George
Songs written by Roy Hay (musician)
Songs written by Mikey Craig
Songs written by Jon Moss